Sphaerodactylus verdeluzicola, also known commonly as the  Puerto Rican karst gecko, is a small species of lizard in the family Sphaerodactylidae. The species is endemic to Puerto Rico.

References

Sphaerodactylus
Endemic fauna of Puerto Rico
Reptiles of Puerto Rico
Reptiles described in 2022